158A is a train carriage built by H. Cegielski in Poznań. The train carriage is built for national and international passenger transportation with a maximum speed of 200 km/h on tracks with a width of 1435 mm.

Specification

Carriage Body Structure

The chassis and bodywork is a welded structure made of carbon steel with high strength and resistance to corrosion. The whole carriage is covered with corrosion protection, which, together with a covering paint ensures long-term durability of the wagon body. The spaces in the internal walls and the roof is covered with damping mats of a non-combustible material.

Passenger Compartment

In the interior of the passenger compartment there are arranged in series, seats made out of wool fabric. Above the windows there are placed racks for luggage and a panel fitted with individual lighting for each seat, the monitor includes the lighting setup and seating reservation. Above each carriage door there is a display with information regarding the time, speed and railway stations. The interior lighting for the carriage is made up of uses LED lamps.

References

Passenger railroad cars
Rail transport in Poland